Lili Sebesi (born 22 July 1992) is a French sailor. She competed at the 2020 Summer Olympics in the 49er FX class together with Albane Dubois.

References

External links
 
 
 

1992 births
Living people
French female sailors (sport)
Olympic sailors of France
Sailors at the 2020 Summer Olympics – 49er FX
French people of Hungarian descent
21st-century French women